Valkenedy da Silva Nascimento (born 13 June 1993) is a Brazilian professional footballer who plays for Clube Náutico Almirante Barroso on loan from Brusque as a midfielder.

Club career
He made his professional debut in the Campeonato Brasileiro Série B for CRB on 9 May 2015 in a game against Bragantino.

References

External links 
 
 
 Valkenedy at ZeroZero

1993 births
Footballers from São Paulo
Living people
Brazilian footballers
Association football midfielders
Brazilian expatriate footballers
Expatriate footballers in Portugal
Clube de Regatas Brasil players
Ituano FC players
Clube Atlético Metropolitano players